Hard trance is a subgenre of trance music that originated in Belgium, Germany and the Netherlands in the early 1990s as the Breakbeat hardcore production community began to diversify into new and different styles of electronic music, all influenced by Hard house, New beat, Happy hardcore and Jungle music. The popularity of hard trance peaked during the late 1990s and has since then faded in scope of newer forms of trance.

Hard trance is often characterized by strong, hard (or even downpitch) kicks, fully resonant basses and an increased amount of reverberation applied to the main beat. Melodies vary from 140 to 180 BPMs and it can feature plain instrumental sound in early compositions, with the latter ones tending to implement side-chaining techniques of progressive on digital synthesizers.

Hard trance was the final form of progressive to hit the mainstream. It eventually morphed into hardstyle, jumpstyle and gabber. Its mainstream popularity decreased in the mid-2000s.

History 

The hard trance sound developed out of the breakbeat hardcore/hardcore era which itself developed from Belgian New Beat industrial style of Techno. When the hardcore breakbeat production community split into its separate subgenres, hard trance began to develop within the breakbeat hardcore production community. Hard trance went on to become one of the dominant and most successful electronic music styles throughout the 1990s in mainland Europe and around the world. The British electronic music scene split off into other styles such as jungle/drum and bass, hardcore, techno and house.

Popularity, commercialisation and commercial downfall 
Remaining popular around 1993–1997 in mainland Europe, hard trance was associated with mega-raves of many thousands of ravers. Many series of compilation CDs came initially from the originators of the sound and the clubs that promoted it. It ultimately went overground and reached commercial status becoming known commercially as "maximaal".

Throughout the 1990s the popularity of the sound caused a flurry of popular and financially successful tracks to be licensed by major record labels, with the sound becoming aggressively marketed through commercial compilations on TV, radio and across the different forms of media. In Belgium hard trance was popular in the 1990s, with the label Bonzai Records and titles such as The First Rebirth by Jones & Stephenson released in 1993 , Rave City by Yves Deruyter released in 1993 , Let There Be House
by Cherrymoon Trax released in 1994 , The Wave by The Belgica Wave Party released in 1993 , Belgium Jump by Dream Your Dream released in 1993 , Back To Reality by Phrenetic System released in 1994 .

United Kingdom 
The hard trance sound came to the UK via the underground techno community in clubs such as Heaven, Trade, Melt and FF and Fist or through clubs such as The Orbit in Morley and Club UK in London. It never reached the same commercial heights or as on the continental mainland due to British music scene already being widely diversified into styles such as jungle/drum & bass, hardcore and house. However it is frequently played in the free party scene and many clubs and festivals still play it to this day.

New Zealand 
New Zealand was late to the party and enjoyed Hard Trance into the mid 2000’s. The majority of clubs were centred in the K road region of Auckland and included Kiss, Bed, Stair Case and Jones Bar. Auckland’s scene was well supplied and transitioned to drum and bass, breaks and eventually dub step in the late 2000’s

Influence on other musical styles

Netherlands
Alongside the birth of hard trance, the same producers and record labels were already producing and developing the jumpstyle sound, the successor of gabber, which was popular in the Netherlands. Jumpstyle used the same sounds as the hard trance sound with faster beat patterns but slightly slower than gabber, this developed directly into hardstyle toward the end of the 1990s, which along hardtechno and hard house came to dominate the harder spectrum of electronic music.

United Kingdom 
The sound influenced and led to the development of UK hard house and its subgenres, prior to this style the UK clubs where hard house developed were typically already playing a mixture of harder techno styles, progressive trance, electro and hardstyle incorporating many sounds and influences from each style can be heard across the others.

Spain 
Jointly with happy hardcore it evolved into makina.

See also 
 Bonzai Records

External links 
 Hardtrance on Reddit
 Moodbook site which mentions hard trance as a subgenre of trance.
 Toucan Music trance information page listing hard trance as a subgenre.

Trance genres

de:Trance (Musik)#Hard Trance